Heartfield is a surname. Notable people with the surname include:

John Heartfield (1891–1961), German photographer
James Heartfield (born 1961), British journalist
Simon Heartfield (born 1962), British musician
Thad Heartfield (1940–2022), United States judge

See also
Hartfield (disambiguation)